RTÉ Investigates: Inside Ireland's Covid Battle is a two-part Irish COVID-19 documentary series, which featured the behind the scenes of the healthcare staff at St. James's Hospital fighting to keep COVID-19 patients alive in ICU. First aired on 29 June 2020 on RTÉ One, it reached an audience of over 755,000 after Taoiseach Micheál Martin said the programme was a "stark reminder" of COVID-19 as the country began to reopen after the lockdown. The second and final episode aired on 30 June 2020.

The RTÉ Investigates team spent 30 days filming inside the hospital in May and June 2020 with the co-operation of staff and patients. Before filming began, the team had to undergo hazard training provided by health and safety experts in the United Kingdom. RTÉ delivered Personal Protective Equipment to the hospital to cover the equipment used by the team during the filming.

Awards

References

External links
 RTÉ Investigates: Inside Ireland's Covid Battle on RTÉ Player

2020s documentary television series
2020 in Irish television
COVID-19 pandemic in the Republic of Ireland
RTÉ original programming
Television shows about the COVID-19 pandemic
Television shows filmed in the Republic of Ireland